Tavros Stadium is a football stadium in Tavros, Athens. It is the home stadium of Fostiras football team. It has the name of Spyros Gialampidis, a founder of Fostiras who died in 1994. In 2002 all of its stands were reconstructed due to their age.

References

Football venues in Greece
Sports venues in Athens